Mahforuz Mahalleh may refer to:
 Mahforuz Mahalleh-ye Olya
 Mahforuz Mahalleh-ye Sofla